Ivana Dlhopolčeková (born 1 June 1986) is a Slovak former ice dancer. She teamed up with partner Hynek Bílek around 2003. They won senior international medals at the 2004 Golden Spin of Zagreb, Ondrej Nepela Memorial, and Pavel Roman Memorial.

Programs 
(with Bílek)

Competitive highlights 
(with Bílek)

References

External links 
 

Slovak female ice dancers
1986 births
Living people
Sportspeople from Banská Bystrica